Article 5 of the European Convention on Human Rights (Art.5 ECHR for short) provides that everyone has the right to liberty and security of person. Liberty and security of the person are taken as a "compound" concept - security of the person has not been subject to separate interpretation by the Court.

History
Article 5 provides the right to liberty and security, subject only to lawful arrest or detention under certain other circumstances, such as arrest on suspicion of a crime or imprisonment in fulfilment of a sentence. The article also provides the right to be informed in a language one understands of the reasons for the arrest and any charge against them, the right of prompt access to judicial proceedings to determine the legality of one's arrest or detention and to trial within a reasonable time or release pending trial, and the right to compensation in the case of arrest or detention in violation of this article.

Magna Carta
Habeas Corpus Act 1679
Entick v. Carrington
Fifth Amendment to the United States Constitution

Case law
HL v. UK. 2004 - App no 45508/99; 40 EHRR 761
 Assanidze v. Georgia, App. No. 71503/01 (Eur. Ct. H.R. Apr. 8, 2004)

See also
European Convention on Human Rights

External links
 A guide to the implementation of Article 5 of the European Convention on Human Rights (PDF)
 Guide on Article 5. Right to liberty and security under 

 
5